Shesh i Bardhë (lit. "white field") is a single Albanian wine variety. It is from Central Albania. It is recommended served  slightly chilled at about 50 degrees Fahrenheit. It is medium bodied at 13%.

References

Albanian wine